The 2025 FIFA Club World Cup will be the 21st edition of the FIFA Club World Cup, an international club association football competition organized by FIFA. The tournament is planned to be the first under an expanded format with 32 teams and will be held in June and July 2025. A previous proposal to expand the tournament to 24 teams in China in 2021 had been cancelled due to the COVID-19 pandemic.

Background
FIFA president Gianni Infantino announced the expanded format in December 2022, but the proposal is subject to approval by the six confederations. The proposed expansion was criticized by FIFPRO, a global union of professional players, as well as the World Leagues Forum, which represents professional leagues; both organizations raised concerns about player welfare due to the added fixtures in an already congested playing calendar. La Liga — the Spanish top division league — also criticized the plan and said in a statement that it would consider legal action to block the expansion.

Slot allocation and qualification

On 14 February 2023, the FIFA Council approved the slot allocation for the 2025 tournament based on a "set of objective metrics and criteria". UEFA were awarded the most slots with twelve, while CONMEBOL were given the second-most with six. The AFC, CAF and CONCACAF were all given four slots, while the OFC and the host association were given one slot each. On 14 March, the FIFA Council approved the key principles of the access list for the tournament. The principles are as follows, considering competitions completed during a four-year period from 2021 to 2024:
CONMEBOL and UEFA (more than four slots): access for the winners of the confederation's top club competition between 2021 and 2024, with additional teams to be determined by a club ranking of the four-year period
AFC, CAF and CONCACAF (four slots each): access for the winners of the confederation's top club competition between 2021 and 2024
OFC (one slot): access for the highest-ranked club among the winners of the confederation's top club competition between 2021 and 2024
Host country (one slot): To be determined at a later stage

If a club wins two or more seasons of their confederation's top club competition, additional teams will be determined by a club ranking of the four-year period. A restriction of two clubs per association will be applied, with an exception for champion clubs if more than two clubs from the same association win their confederation's top club competition. The calculation method for the four-year club rankings within each confederation will be based on sporting criteria during seasons completed between 2021 and 2024, and will be finalized after consultation with confederations and stakeholders.

Based on the access list, the following teams have qualified for the tournament:

Notes

References

External links

2025
2025 in association football
June 2025 sports events
July 2025 sports events